Martial Van Schelle (sometimes shown as Martial van Schelle, 6 July 1899 – 15 March 1943) was a Belgian bobsledder, swimmer, aviator, and businessman who competed in both the Summer and Winter Olympics for Belgium from the early 1920s to the late 1930s. He was captured by the Nazis during World War II and executed in a concentration camp.

Early life
Born in 1899, Van Schelle spent the early part of his life in the United States. Living in Chicago, Illinois from 1904 to 1918, he lost his mother Annie when she was killed aboard the RMS Lusitania when it was sunk in 1915 by a German U-boat. This resulted in him joining the American Expeditionary Force which landed in France in 1918 as a doughboy. Following the end of hostilities of World War I, Van Schelle stayed over in Belgium to help the nation rebuild.

Sporting career
Competing in three Summer Olympics, Van Schelle's best finish was 10th in the men's 4 × 200 m freestyle relay at Paris in 1924. Van Schelle also participated in ballooning in the Gordon Bennett Cup twice, finishing fifth in 1933 and seventh in 1938. At the 1936 Winter Olympics in Garmisch-Partenkirchen, Van Schelle competed in bobsleigh. He finished fifth in the four-man competition and ninth in the two-man event.

Business career
Van Schelle owned a sporting goods store in Brussels, earning an American patent for a tennis racket in 1935. He later became owner of two Ice rinks in Brussels between 1933 and 1935, remaining owner until he was arrested by the Nazis on 15 January 1943.

Death
Taken away to Breendonk concentration camp, Van Schelle was executed by shooting on 15 March 1943.

References

1899 births
1943 deaths
United States Army personnel of World War I
Belgian emigrants to the United States
Belgian aviators
Belgian male bobsledders
20th-century Belgian businesspeople
Belgian civilians killed in World War II
Belgian male freestyle swimmers
Bobsledders at the 1936 Winter Olympics
Olympic bobsledders of Belgium
Olympic swimmers of Belgium
Executed Belgian people
Bobsledders from Chicago
Swimmers at the 1920 Summer Olympics
Swimmers at the 1924 Summer Olympics
Swimmers at the 1928 Summer Olympics
United States Army soldiers
People executed by Nazi Germany by firearm
Belgian people executed in Nazi concentration camps
People who died in Breendonk prison camp
Swimmers from Chicago